Events of the year 1960 in Japan. It corresponds to Shōwa 35 (昭和35年) in the Japanese calendar.

1960 was a year of prolonged and intense political struggles in Japan. The massive and often quite violent Miike Coal Mine Strike at the Miike Coal Mine in Kyushu lasted nearly the entire year, and the massive nationwide Anpo Protests against renewal of the U.S.-Japan Security Treaty carried over from 1959 and climaxed in June, forcing the resignation of Prime Minister Nobusuke Kishi and the cancellation of a planned visit to Japan by U.S. President Dwight D. Eisenhower.

Incumbents
Emperor: Hirohito (Emperor Shōwa)
Prime Minister:
Nobusuke Kishi (L) until July 19,
Hayato Ikeda (L)
Chief Justice of Japan: Kōtarō Tanaka until October 24, Kisaburo Yokota
Chief Cabinet Secretary: Etsusaburō Shiina until July 19, Masayoshi Ōhira
Speaker of the House of Representatives of Japan: Ryōgorō Katō until February 1, Ichirō Kiyose
Speaker of the House of Councillors of Japan: Tsuruhei Matsuno

Governors
Aichi Prefecture: Mikine Kuwahara 
Akita Prefecture: Yūjirō Obata 
Aomori Prefecture: Iwao Yamazaki 
Chiba Prefecture: Hitoshi Shibata 
Ehime Prefecture: Sadatake Hisamatsu 
Fukui Prefecture: Eizō Kita 
Fukuoka Prefecture: Taichi Uzaki
Fukushima Prefecture: Zenichiro Satō 
Gifu Prefecture: Yukiyasu Matsuno 
Gunma Prefecture: Toshizo Takekoshi (until 1 August); Konroku Kanda (starting 2 August)
Hiroshima Prefecture: Hiroo Ōhara 
Hokkaido: Kingo Machimura 
Hyogo Prefecture: Masaru Sakamoto 
Ibaraki Prefecture: Nirō Iwakami 
Ishikawa Prefecture: Jūjitsu Taya 
Iwate Prefecture: Senichi Abe 
Kagawa Prefecture: Masanori Kaneko 
Kagoshima Prefecture: Katsushi Terazono 
Kanagawa Prefecture: Iwataro Uchiyama 
Kochi Prefecture: Masumi Mizobuchi 
Kumamoto Prefecture: Kōsaku Teramoto 
Kyoto Prefecture: Torazō Ninagawa 
Mie Prefecture: Satoru Tanaka 
Miyagi Prefecture: Yoshio Miura 
Miyazaki Prefecture: Hiroshi Kuroki 
Nagano Prefecture: Gon'ichirō Nishizawa 
Nagasaki Prefecture: Katsuya Sato 
Nara Prefecture: Ryozo Okuda 
Niigata Prefecture: Kazuo Kitamura
Oita Prefecture: Kaoru Kinoshita 
Okayama Prefecture: Yukiharu Miki 
Osaka Prefecture: Gisen Satō 
Saga Prefecture: Sunao Ikeda 
Saitama Prefecture: Hiroshi Kurihara 
Shiga Prefecture: Kyujiro Taniguchi 
Shiname Prefecture: Choemon Tanabe 
Shizuoka Prefecture: Toshio Saitō 
Tochigi Prefecture: Nobuo Yokokawa 
Tokushima Prefecture: Kikutaro Hara 
Tokyo: Ryōtarō Azuma 
Tottori Prefecture: Jirō Ishiba 
Toyama Prefecture: Minoru Yoshida 
Wakayama Prefecture: Shinji Ono 
Yamagata Prefecture: Tōkichi Abiko 
Yamaguchi Prefecture: Taro Ozawa (until 17 August); Masayuki Hashimoto (starting 25 September)
Yamanashi Prefecture: Hisashi Amano

Events

January 15 – The first televised anime, Three Tales, is broadcast on NHK in Japan.
January 19 – Prime Minister Kishi and President Eisenhower sign the revised Treaty of Mutual Cooperation and Security Between the United States and Japan at a ceremony in Washington D.C.
January 19 – Mitsui corporation locks protesting miners out of the Miike Coal Mine in Kyushu, launching the 312-day Miike Coal Mine Strike.
February 23 – Naruhito, son of Akihito and Michiko is born in Tokyo Imperial Palace.
February 23 – As part of the ongoing Miike Struggle, picketing coal miner Kiyoshi Kubo is stabbed to death by a yakuza gangster.
May 19 – The "May 19th Incident" – Prime Minister Kishi unexpectedly calls for a snap vote on the revised Security Treaty and has police drag opposition Diet Members out of the National Diet to pass the treaty with only members of his own party present.

June 10 – The "Hagerty Incident" – A car carrying Eisenhower's press secretary James Hagerty and U.S. Ambassador to Japan Douglas MacArthur II is mobbed by protesters outside of Tokyo's Haneda Airport, requiring the occupants to be rescued by a U.S. Marines helicopter.
June 15 – The "June 15 Incident" – As part of the Anpo Protests, radical student activists from Zengakuren attempt to storm the National Diet compound, precipitating a battle with police in which female Tokyo University student Michiko Kanba is killed.
June 19 – The new U.S.-Japan Security Treaty is automatically ratified 30 days after passing the Lower House of the Diet.
July 15 – The Kishi cabinet resigns en masse to take responsibility for the violent Anpo Protests. Kishi is officially succeeded as prime minister by Hayato Ikeda on July 19.
July 24 – According to Japan National Police Agency official confirmed report, a charter bus collision with regular route bus, charter bus plunge into cliff in mountain road, Mount Hiei, Otsu, Shiga Prefecture, 28 person were perish, 16 person were hurt.
August 10 – lubricant brand Kure Engineering was founded.  
August 25 – September 11 – Japan competes at the Olympics in Rome and win 4 gold, 7 silver and 7 bronze medals.
October 12 – The Assassination of Inejirō Asanuma - Japan Socialist Party Chairman Inejirō Asanuma is assassinated by a right-wing ultra-nationalist teenager Otoya Yamaguchi while speaking in a televised political debate in Tokyo.
December 1 – Striking coal miners at the Miike Coal Mine return to work, ending the 312-day Miike Struggle.

Births
January 6 – Kumiko Ohba, actress, singer, and psychological counselor
January 25 – Miki Narahashi, voice actress
February 23 – Naruhito, 126th emperor of Japan
March 12 – Maki Nomiya,  singer and musician
March 23 – Yoko Tawada, writer
March 29 – Hiromi Tsuru, voice actress (d. 2017)
April 4 – Kanako Fukaura, actress (d. 2008)
April 24 – Masami Kikuchi, voice actor
May 15 – Izumi Aki, actress
May 22 – Hideaki Anno, animator, film director, and actor
June 7 – Hirohiko Araki, manga artist
June 23 – Mizue Takada, singer
July 9 – Yūko Asano, actress and singer
July 18 – Hiroshi Negishi, anime director
August 4 – Jun Miho, actress
August 18 – Yuki Ninagawa, actress
August 19 – Asa Nonami, writer
September 3 – Seiko Noda, politician and cabinet minister
September 8 – Misako Konno, actress and essayist
September 11 – Mayo Suzukaze, actress
September 25 – Kaoru Tada, manga artist (d. 1999)
October 5
Hitomi Kuroki, actress
Toru Takahashi, race car driver (d. 1983)
October 7 – Kyosuke Himuro, singer-songwriter
October 10 – Kōji Kamibayashi, television former CEO
October 17 – Chie Kōjiro, voice actress
November 9 – Eri Ishida, actress
November 10 – Naomi Kawashima, actress, singer and radio entertainer (d. 2015)
December 14 – Miki Takakura, idol and actress
December 17 – Tarako, actress, voice actress and singer
December 18 – Kazuhide Uekusa, economist
December 24 – Fuyumi Ono, novelist
December 29 – Kayoko Kishimoto, actress

Deaths
January 24 – Ashihei Hino, writer (b. 1907)
June 15 – Michiko Kanba, political activist (b. 1937)
August 28 – Takeru Inukai, politician and novelist (b. 1896)
October 12 - Inejiro Asanuma, politician (b. 1898)
November 2 – Otoya Yamaguchi, assassin (b. 1943)

See also
 List of Japanese films of 1960

References

 
Years of the 20th century in Japan
Japan